Brushford is a village and civil parish  south of Dulverton and  north of Tiverton in Devon, in the Somerset West and Taunton district of Somerset, England. According to the 2001 census it had a population of 535 in 243 households, reducing to 519 at the 2011 Census.

The River Exe which forms the boundary of the parish and the border between Somerset and Devon is crossed by the 18th-century Exe Bridge. The River Barle is crossed by the New Bridge dating from 1870, which led to Pixton Park, and the Weir Bridge which dates from the mid 19th century. West Somerset Polo Club used to play in fields below the village alongside the River Barle. The fields in the area are now mainly grazed by stock.

The village consists of a local garage, some housing areas, a playground with a basketball court, a village hall and a church. Its population increased at four times the rate of the UK percentage growth rate, over the years 1994 to 2004 and a need for more affordable housing was identified in 2006.

History

The village was known as Brucheford or Brigeford in the Domesday Book of 1086 when it was held by Robert, Count of Mortain, and Briggeford in 1270.

In Saxon times it was a tributary manor of Dulverton, held by Ordwulf on behalf of King Edward II and paid a tax of 24 sheep. The parish of Brushford was part of the Williton and Freemanners Hundred.

It was also home to the Dulverton railway station which was the largest intermediate station on the Devon and Somerset Railway, which ran from Taunton to Barnstaple. The station served the town of Dulverton and from 1884 acted also as the junction station for the Exe Valley Railway. Exe Valley services ceased with the closure of the line on 7 October 1963. Goods services were withdrawn at Dulverton the following year and complete closure of the Devon and Somerset line came on 3 October 1966. The station buildings survived as part of the Caernarvon Arms Hotel, which was visited by the poet Tennyson in 1891, and has since been re-developed into flats.

Governance

The parish council has responsibility for local issues, including setting an annual precept (local rate) to cover the council's operating costs and producing annual accounts for public scrutiny. The parish council evaluates local planning applications and works with the local police, district council officers, and neighbourhood watch groups on matters of crime, security, and traffic. The parish council's role also includes initiating projects for the maintenance and repair of parish facilities, as well as consulting with the district council on the maintenance, repair, and improvement of highways, drainage, footpaths, public transport, and street cleaning. Conservation matters (including trees and listed buildings) and environmental issues are also the responsibility of the council.

The village falls within the non-metropolitan district of Somerset West and Taunton, which was established on 1 April 2019. It was previously in the district of West Somerset, which was formed on 1 April 1974 under the Local Government Act 1972, and part of Dulverton Rural District before that. The district council is responsible for local planning and building control, local roads, council housing, environmental health, markets and fairs, refuse collection and recycling, cemeteries and crematoria, leisure services, parks, and tourism.

Somerset County Council is responsible for running the largest and most expensive local services such as education, social services, libraries, main roads, public transport, policing and fire services, trading standards, waste disposal and strategic planning.

It is also part of the Bridgwater and West Somerset county constituency represented in the House of Commons of the Parliament of the United Kingdom. It elects one Member of Parliament (MP) by the first past the post system of election. It was part of the South West England constituency of the European Parliament prior to Britain leaving the European Union in January 2020, which elected seven MEPs using the d'Hondt method of party-list proportional representation.

Religious sites

The Anglican parish Church of St Nicholas was built in the 15th century, but has undergone a range of rebuilding and development since. It has been designated as a Grade I listed building. The Herbert memorial chapel, designed by Sir Edwin Lutyens, includes a chest tomb with effigy of Aubrey Herbert of Pixton Park, the Conservative Member of Parliament (MP) for the Southern division of Somerset from 1911 to 1918, and for Yeovil from 1918 until his death in 1923, by Cecil de Banquiere Howard of Paris under a wooden canopy also designed by Lutyens. The church has a medieval screen, 13th-century font and possibly the oldest parish chest in the country, hollowed from a tree trunk.

References

External links

 Brushford parish website

Villages in West Somerset
Civil parishes in Somerset